Guirane N'Daw (born 24 April 1984) is a Senegalese former professional footballer who played as a defensive midfielder. He played for Sochaux, Nantes, Saint-Étienne, and Lens in France, for Zaragoza in Spain, for Birmingham City and Ipswich Town in England, and for Asteras Tripolis in Greece.

Club career
N'Daw began his career with Sochaux. He appeared in over 120 matches, which included the 2007 Coupe de France Final as Sochaux beat Olympique Marseille on penalties, and scored five goals for the club before moving to Nantes in 2008. After Nantes were relegated to Ligue 2 at the end of his first season with the club, N'Daw joined Saint-Étienne on loan for the 2009–10 Ligue 1 season. The deal included a clause by which the move would be made permanent if Saint-Étienne retained their top-flight status. After a successful campaign, the loan was made permanent for a fee of €4m. On 24 January 2011 N'Daw joined Spanish club Real Zaragoza on loan until the end of the season.

On 23 August 2011, N'Daw joined English Championship (second-tier) club Birmingham City on loan until January 2012, with an option to extend the contract until the end of the season. He made his debut for the club in a 3–1 defeat to Braga in the group stages of the Europa League. After several Europa League appearances, N'Daw finally made his Football League debut as a second-half substitute in a 2–1 defeat at Hull City in December. He established himself alongside Keith Fahey in Birmingham's midfield, and shortly before he left for the 2012 Africa Cup of Nations, his loan was extended to the end of the season.

Following Senegal's early elimination from the tournament, N'Daw's form and fitness levels dipped. He suffered recurrent hamstring injuries, including one sustained after 67 minutes of the visit to West Ham United in early April, in which he produced a strong performance protecting his defence. He returned for the play-off semi-final at Blackpool alongside Jordon Mutch, also coming back from injury, but was "rusty and lacked sharpness to impose", and the pairing gave the ball away too much. In the home leg, he came on for the injured Jonathan Spector, and helped his team stage a recovery from two goals behind to draw the match but lose the play-off on aggregate. Over the season, he made 29 appearances, of which 19 were in the league, without scoring.

N'Daw joined English Championship club Ipswich Town on 24 August 2012 on loan for the 2012–13 season.

After his Saint-Étienne contract expired, N'Daw signed a one-year deal with Greek Superleague club Asteras Tripolis on 4 September 2013.

In summer 2014, N'Daw joined Ligue 1 FC Metz on a two-year deal.

He left in October 2016, having failed to make an appearance in the 2015–16 season and following the arrival of coach Alain Casanova he left Ligue 2 side Lens.

International career
N'Daw first played for the Senegal national football team in 2004. He earned 41 caps for his country scoring 4 goals. He represented the national team at the 2006 Africa Cup of Nations, where his team took fourth place for the third time in history. He was named in the 23-man squad for the 2012 Africa Cup of Nations, and played in two of their three group match defeats as Senegal failed to qualify for the later stages of the tournament.

International goals
Scores and results list Senegal's goal tally first, score column indicates score after each N’Daw goal.

Age fabrication
In February 2020, in an interview with a Senegalese radio station, N'Daw admitted to age fabrication stating that he had lowered his age to turn professional and that it was common practise among Senegalese footballers.

Personal life
On 31 January 2019, N'Daw joined French amateur club AS Algrange.

Honours
Sochaux
 Coupe de France: 2007

References

External links
 
 

1984 births
Living people
Association football midfielders
Association football defenders
Senegalese footballers
Senegal international footballers
FC Sochaux-Montbéliard players
FC Nantes players
AS Saint-Étienne players
Real Zaragoza players
Birmingham City F.C. players
Ipswich Town F.C. players
Asteras Tripolis F.C. players
FC Metz players
RC Lens players
Ligue 1 players
Ligue 2 players
La Liga players
English Football League players
Super League Greece players
2006 Africa Cup of Nations players
2008 Africa Cup of Nations players
2012 Africa Cup of Nations players
Senegalese expatriate footballers
Expatriate footballers in France
Expatriate footballers in Spain
Expatriate footballers in England
Expatriate footballers in Greece
Senegalese expatriate sportspeople in England
AS Algrange players